Kamayan (Tagalog for "[eating] with the hands"), also known as kinamot or kinamut in Visayan languages, is the traditional Filipino method of eating with the bare hands. It is also used to describe the Filipino communal feast (also called a salu-salo) where food is served on banana leaves and eaten without utensils.

Another term for kamayan is boodle fight which is used in the context of the military practice of eating a communal meal.

Etymology

Sources indicate that the term "boodle" is American military slang for contraband sweets such as cake, candy and ice cream. A "boodle fight" is a party in which boodle fare is served. The term may have also been derived from "kit and caboodle"; caboodle is further derived from boodle or booty.

History
The practice of kamayan is pre-colonial. It has been described in by Antonio Pigafetta in the Magellan expedition, as well as by Spanish missionaries during the Spanish colonial period. While utensils like wooden spoons and ladles existed for serving and cooking in pre-colonial Filipino culture, they were not used for eating.

The practice was tolerated during the Spanish period, but it was suppressed during the American colonial period when American dining etiquette and the use of spoons and forks were aggressively promoted.

Description
Kamayan describes the act of eating with the bare hands, which is the traditional pre-colonial method of eating in Filipino culture. This is done by forming a small mound of rice, adding a piece of the accompanying dish for flavor (the ), compressing it into a small pyramid with the fingers, lifting it to the mouth nestled in four cupped fingers, and then pushing it into the mouth with the thumb. The entire process only uses the fingers of one hand. It never uses the palms of the hands and the fingers also never enter the mouth. The other hand is not used and may instead be used to hold the plate or a drink.

Kamayan also describes the traditional communal feasts or family meals, where rice and various colorful dishes are placed on banana leaves and eaten together. The banana leaves are washed and slightly wilted over open flames to bring out an oily sheen and then laid out on a long table.

The dishes are arranged equidistantly throughout the table to ensure everyone has equal access. Rice are typically plain steamed white rice that is not too mushy, sinangag (garlic rice), or rice cooked in coconut leaves (puso). Typical dishes aside from rice, includes inihaw (barbecues, including lechon, whole roasted pork), lumpia, fried meats (like crispy pata), tocino (cured pork), tapa, longganisa (sausages), pancit (noodles), boiled eggs or salted eggs, seafood, dried fish, and blanched, fresh, or stir-fried vegetables. These are provided with a variety of sawsawan (dipping sauces), calamansi, bagoong, as well as pickled vegetables (atchara). Desserts are also included, like ripe or unripe Philippine mangoes, pineapples, watermelons, papaya, young coconut, leche flan, and various kakanin (rice cakes). Drinks are usually fruit juices, beer, wine, or softdrinks. As a rule, soups and stews are not included.

Kamayan is an informal and intimate method of dining. It has a general atmosphere of sharing, and participants usually talk throughout the meal. It does not have the strict etiquette and rules of western dining, and the dishes served depend on what is available. A growing number of Filipino restaurants are serving meals kamayan-style.

Boodle fight
A boodle fight is a meal that dispenses with cutlery and dishes. Diners instead practice kamayan. The food is placed on top of a long banana leaf-lined trestle table and in the true military practice, diners do not sit in chairs but instead stand shoulder to shoulder in a line on both sides of the table.  

A senior officer or enlisted personnel then utters the traditional command for the boodle fight to begin:

"Ready on the left,
 Ready on the right,
 Commence boodle fight!"

See also
Banana leaf
Military tradition
Sadya

References

External links 
 

Eating parties
Serving and dining
Armed Forces of the Philippines
Philippine cuisine
Military life